Joe Gould (August 13, 1896 – April 21, 1950) was an American boxing manager best known for representing boxer James J. Braddock, dubbed "The Cinderella Man," who in 1935 upset Max Baer to become the world heavyweight champion. He also managed lightweight contender Ray Miller from 1930–1933.

Career
Gould met then 20-year-old amateur boxer James Braddock at Joe Jeanette's gym in Hoboken, New Jersey in 1925. With Gould as his manager, Braddock turned pro in 1926 and went 14-0-2 before losing his first fight.  After a completely one-sided loss to defending Light Heavyweight champion Tommy Loughran in July 1929, Braddock's career fell into decline as he lost more than won.  By 1933, unable to support his family as a boxer, Braddock worked as a longshoreman and went on public assistance.

Gould was instrumental in forging a phenomenal comeback for Braddock in June 1934 when Primo Carnera was scheduled to defend his Heavyweight title against Max Baer.  The promoters needed an opponent for up and coming John “Corn” Griffin on the undercard. Gould pleaded for Braddock to be inserted as Griffin's opponent stating that Braddock needed money just to put food on the table for his children. They agreed to pay him $250 for a 6-rounder against Griffin which Braddock won in 3 rounds.  Five months later Braddock decisively won a rematch against John Henry Lewis in 10 rounds followed by an easy 15-round decision against Art Lasky.

Braddock was then slated to face Max Baer, the reigning heavyweight champion of the world.  On June 13, 1935, at Madison Square Garden, the 10-to-1 underdog Braddock won the world heavyweight championship in one of the most stunning upsets in boxing history.  On June 27, 1937, Braddock lost the title to Heavyweight contender Joe Louis.  Seven months later, in the final fight of his career, he defeated Tommy Farr in Madison Square Garden.

Later life
Gould enlisted in the U.S. Army in 1942, and became a first lieutenant. He was dismissed from the Army and sentenced to three years of hard labor after a court-martial in 1944 for conspiracy to accept bribes.

Gould died from leukemia on April 21, 1950.

Fictional portrayals
In the 2005 film Cinderella Man, Gould is portrayed by actor Paul Giamatti. The role earned him an Academy Award nomination for Best Supporting Actor.

References

1896 births
1950 deaths
American boxing managers
Sportspeople from Hoboken, New Jersey
Jewish American military personnel
American prisoners and detainees
Deaths from leukemia
United States Army personnel of World War II
United States Army officers
United States Army personnel who were court-martialed
Deaths from cancer in the United States
20th-century American Jews
Military personnel from New Jersey
Prisoners and detainees of the United States military